Coleophora maritimarum is a moth of the family Coleophoridae. It is found in the French and Italian Alps.

The larvae probably feed on Aster alpinus.

References

maritimarum
Moths described in 2004
Moths of Europe